The Tham Khuyen is a palaeontological formation located in Vietnam. It dates to the Jurassic period.  The cave is located in Lang Son province, about 125 kilometers northeast of Hanoi.

See also 
 List of fossil sites

References
  (1993); Wildlife of Gondwana. Reed. 
 

Mesozoic paleontological sites of Asia
Caves of Vietnam
Landforms of Lạng Sơn province
Jurassic paleontological sites